Liudas is a masculine Lithuanian given name. Notable people with the name include:

Liudas Gira (1884–1946), Lithuanian poet, writer and literary critic
Liudas Jakavicius-Grimalauskas (1910–1998), Lithuanian pianist, composer and theatre director
Liudas Mažylis, Lithuanian politician
Liudas Rumbutis (born 1955), Lithuanian-Belarusian footballer and manager
Liudas Vaineikis (1869–1938), Lithuanian physician and book smuggler
Liudas Vilimas (1912–1966), Lithuanian painter

Lithuanian masculine given names